David Julian Winnick (born 26 June 1933) is a British Labour Party politician who was the Member of Parliament (MP) for Walsall North between 1979 and 2017, he was also the MP for Croydon South from 1966 to 1970.

Early life
Born into a British Jewish family, Winnick was an advertising manager and a branch chairman of the Clerical and Administrative Workers Union.
He was a councillor from 1959 on Willesden Borough Council, then on the London Borough of Brent.

Parliamentary career
After unsuccessfully fighting Harwich in 1964, Winnick was elected in 1966 as the MP for Croydon South (now the area covered roughly by Croydon Central constituency), defeating incumbent Richard Thompson. He lost the seat to Thompson in 1970. After completing a diploma in social administration at the London School of Economics, he stood again unsuccessfully in Croydon Central in October 1974 and was returned for Walsall North in 1979.

Winnick is generally regarded as being on the left of the Labour Party and has a strong commitment to human rights. That commitment made him a strong voice in the House of Commons against both the Taliban and Saddam Hussein and he supported the 2003 invasion of Iraq.

He was a member of the British-Irish Parliamentary body from its formation in 1990, and British co-chair, 1997–2005.

On 9 November 2005, Winnick's amendment to a government bill on detention of terrorist suspects without trial, proposing that the maximum period of detention should be 28 days rather than 90, passed in the House of Commons by 323 votes to 290, shortly after the government's 90-day proposal was defeated by 322 to 291. This was Tony Blair's first defeat in the House of Commons on a whipped vote, after serving nearly nine years as Prime Minister, and may come to be seen as a critical moment of his term in office.

In January 2009, he urged the Communities Minister to deplore the fact that Richard Williamson, a British-born bishop and Holocaust denier, had been brought back into the fold by the Vatican.

Winnick played a prominent role in the campaign to force the resignation of the Speaker of the House of Commons, Michael Martin. This followed controversy from May 2009 concerning MPs' disclosure of expenses.

At the 2010 general election, Walsall North was one of the most closely contested seats at the election, with Winnick being re-elected with a significantly reduced majority of 990 votes, compared to 6,640 votes at the previous election five years earlier. In 2015, however, Winnick gained a comfortable majority of 1,937, despite the Labour Party incurring a net loss of seats. In his victory speech, he criticised the way in which his Conservative opponent had conducted their election campaign.

In 2017 (again against the national trend) he was defeated by Conservative Party candidate Eddie Hughes by 2,601 votes.

References

External links
David Winnick official site
Guardian Unlimited Politics – Ask Aristotle: David Winnick MP
TheyWorkForYou.com – David Winnick MP

The Public Whip – David Winnick MP voting record
Public Whip – Commons vote on Winnick's amendment to Terrorism Bill Clause 23, 9 November 2005

1933 births
Living people
Alumni of the London School of Economics
English Jews
Jewish British politicians
Labour Party (UK) MPs for English constituencies
Politics of the London Borough of Croydon
Councillors in Greater London
Councillors in the London Borough of Brent
UK MPs 1966–1970
UK MPs 1979–1983
UK MPs 1983–1987
UK MPs 1987–1992
UK MPs 1992–1997
UK MPs 1997–2001
UK MPs 2001–2005
UK MPs 2005–2010
UK MPs 2010–2015
UK MPs 2015–2017